Andreas Gottlob Rudelbach (29 September 1792 - 3 March 1862)   was a Dano-German neo-Lutheran theologian.

Biography
He was born at Copenhagen; died at Slagelse, Zealand. He was educated the Metropolitanskolen and  attended the University of Copenhagen, where he received the  academic title privatdozent. During this period in collaboration with N. F. S. Grundtvig,  he edited  the Theologisk Maanedskrift (13 vols., 1825 sqq.) In 1829 he was called to the pastorate of Glauchau, Saxony, where he aided religious awakening and revolt against the rationalism of the period, though at the same time he opposed any formal separation from the Lutheran Church. In 1830 he aided in founding the Muldenthal pastoral conference, but opposition gradually developed against him, largely based on the issued of his uncompromising Lutheranism dogma. In 1845 he resigned his pastorate and returned to Denmark. From 1846 to 1848 he lectured at the University of Copenhagen on Dogmatic theology, but the death of his royal patron in the latter year exposed him to the attacks. He accordingly accepted a call to the pastorate of Slagelse in 1848.   

He edited the Zeitschrift für die gesammte lutherische Theologie und Kirche (in collaboration with H. E. F. Guericke, Leipzig, 1839 sqq.) and Christliche Biographie, i (1849), and wrote, in addition to the works already mentioned and several volumes of sermons: Hieronymus Savonarola und seine Zeit (Hamburg, 1835); Reformation, Luthertum und Union (Leipzig, 1839); Historische-kritische Einleitung in die Augsburgische Konfession (Dresden, 1841); Amtliches Gutachten über die Wiedereinführung der Katechismus-Examina im Königreich Sachsen, nebst historischer Erörterung der Kathechismus-Anstalten in der evangelisch-lutherischen Kirche Deutschlands (1841); and Om Psalme-Literaturen og Psalmebogs-Sagen, historisk-kritiske Undersögelser (Copenhagen, 1856).

References

1792 births
1862 deaths
19th-century Protestant theologians
Danish Lutheran theologians
Danish Lutheran clergy
People from Slagelse
University of Copenhagen alumni
Academic staff of the University of Copenhagen